Epineri Vula (died 27 April 1988) was a Fijian lawyer and politician. He served as a member of the Senate from 1982 to 1987, and as a Supreme Court justice from 1987 until his death the following year.

Biography

Vula attended the Victoria University of Wellington, graduating in 1964. He subsequently worked as a lawyer.

In 1982 he was appointed to the Senate as one of the nominees of the Great Council of Chiefs. Following the 1987 coup he was appointed as a judge in the Supreme Court. He died in the Colonial War Memorial Hospital in Suva in April 1988.

References

Victoria University of Wellington alumni
20th-century Fijian judges
Members of the Senate (Fiji)
Supreme Court of Fiji justices
1988 deaths